The 2020 New Brunswick Tankard, the provincial men's curling championship of New Brunswick was held January 29 to February 2 at the Capital Winter Club in Fredericton, New Brunswick. The winning James Grattan rink represented New Brunswick at the 2020 Tim Hortons Brier in Kingston, Ontario and finished with a 3–4 record.

James Grattan stole two in the tenth end of the final to defeat Jason Roach and win his thirteenth provincial title.

Teams
The teams are listed as follows:

Round-robin standings
Final round-robin standings

Round-robin results
All draw times are listed in Atlantic Time (UTC-04:00).

Draw 1
Wednesday, January 29, 1:30 pm

Draw 2
Wednesday, January 29, 7:30 pm

Draw 3
Thursday, January 30, 1:00 pm

Draw 4
Thursday, January 30, 7:00 pm

Draw 5
Friday, January 31, 1:00 pm

Draw 6
Friday, January 31, 7:00 pm

Draw 7
Saturday, February 1, 9:00 am

Tiebreaker
Saturday, February 1, 2:00 pm

Playoffs

Semifinal
Saturday, February 1, 7:00 pm

Final
Sunday, February 2, 2:00 pm

References

2020 Tim Hortons Brier
Curling competitions in Fredericton
2020 in New Brunswick
New Brunswick Tankard
New Brunswick Tankard